Fenghao is the modern name of the twin city formed by the Western Zhou capitals of Feng and Hao on opposite banks of the Feng River near its confluence with the Wei River in Shaanxi, China.

History
This city was called Feng, Fengxi, or Fengjing (Fēngjīng).

After his son Fa defeated the Shang at Muye and ascended the throne as King Wu (ruled c. 1046–1043 BCE), the capital was moved to a new establishment on the east bank called Hao or Haojing. The two formed a twin capital, with Feng continuing to serve the rituals of the Zhou ancestral shrine and gardens and Hao containing the royal palace and government administration.

Both were abandoned in 771 BC during the Quanrong invasion that drove the Zhou out of the Wei River Valley and brought an end to its Western dynasty. The capital of the Eastern Zhou was located at Chengzhou.

Ruins
The ruins of Fenghao lie in present-day southwest Xi'an in Shaanxi Province. The site was declared an important national cultural heritage site by the State Council of the People's Republic of China in 1961.

See also
 Historical capitals of China

References

This article is based on a translation of "沣镐" in the Chinese Wikipedia.

Ancient Chinese capitals
History of Xi'an
11th-century BC establishments
2nd-millennium BC establishments
Populated places established in the 2nd millennium BC
Major National Historical and Cultural Sites in Shaanxi